Alexander Mitterhuber (1 November 1929 – 30 June 2019) was an Austrian rower. He competed in the men's coxless four event at the 1952 Summer Olympics.

References

External links
 
 

1929 births
2019 deaths
Austrian male rowers
Olympic rowers of Austria
Rowers at the 1952 Summer Olympics
Place of birth missing